Kiyomi Waller (b. December 21, 1967 from Oceanside, California US) is an American professional "Old/Mid School" Bicycle Motocross (BMX) racer whose prime competitive years were from 1989-1998.

His most popular nickname was "Yo-Yo" which was derived from the third and fourth letters of his first name: Ki-YO-mi. This nickname was given by Old School racer 'Shawn Texas'. His second moniker was "The Coyote", possibly a rhyming play on his last name "Waller".

Racing career milestones

Note: Professional firsts are on the National level unless otherwise indicated. Included under the term of "National" are American Bicycle Association (ABA) Gold Cup Qualifiers.

*In the NBL "B" Pro/Super Class/"A" Pro depending on the era; in the ABA it is "A" Pro.
**In the NBL it is "A" Pro/Elite Men; in the ABA it is "AA" Pro.

Career factory and major bike shop sponsors

Note: This listing only denotes the racer's primary sponsors. At any given time a racer could have numerous ever changing co-sponsors. Primary sponsorships can be verified by BMX Press coverage and sponsor's advertisements at the time in question. When possible exact dates are given.

Amateur
Torker: (Co sponsorship) 1980-1982
Returned to racing after a four-year hiatus (1985 – January 1988)
Hidden Valley Bike Shop: Late 1988-?
PeddlePower: Mid May 1989 – Mid January 1990 Was unsponsored for five months until May 1989.
Hustler/Crupi Parts: Mid January 1990 – late March 1990
Redline Bicycles: Late March 1990 – April 22, 1990.
Haro Designs: April 23, 1990 – December 1991.

Professional

Haro/Crupi: January 1992 – 1993
Parkpre Bicycles: 1994 – July 1996. At this time he was also Parkpre's bike designer and engineer.
Trek: July 1996 – October 1997.
Haro Bicycles: October 1997 – early 1999. After Haro dropped him and a few months of paying his own way to races Kiyomi retires for the second time in his career.
Retired for six years (July 1999 – 2005).
GT (Gary Turner) Bicycles: Mid 2005 – early 2006. Waller returns to racing competing in the Veteran's Pro and Master's Classes of the ABA and NBL respectively.
Avent/Bombshell: March 28, 2006 – present

Career bicycle motocross titles

Note: Listed are District, State/Provincial/Department, Regional, National, and International titles in italics. "Defunct" refers to the fact of that sanctioning body in question no longer existing at the start of the racer's career or at that stage of his/her career. Depending on point totals of individual racers, winners of Grand Nationals do not necessarily win National titles. Series and one off Championships are also listed in block.

Amateur
National Bicycle Association (NBA)
None
National Bicycle League (NBL)
18 & Over Expert and 21-27 Cruiser Grand National Champion
American Bicycle Association (ABA)
1989 17 & Over Boys Southern California State Champion
1989 17 & Over Expert National No.3
1990 21-25 Cruiser Gold Cup West Champion
1990 17 & Over Expert Race of Champions (ROC) Champion
1990 21-25 Cruiser Grand National Champion.
1990 21-25 Cruiser No.l (NAG)*
1990 National Cruiser No.3
1991 21-25 Cruiser Grand National Champion.
1991 National Amateur No.8
1991 National Cruiser No.3

*National Age Group

International Bicycle Motocross Federation (IBMXF)
None
Union Cycliste Internationale (UCI)

Professional

National Bicycle Association (NBA)
None
National Bicycle League (NBL)
1997, 1998 Pro Cruiser Grand National Champion.
1997 Pro Cruiser National No.1
2005 Elite Masters National No.3
2006 Masters Elite National No.1
American Bicycle Association (ABA)
1995 & 1997, 1998 Pro Cruiser National No.1
United States Bicycle Motocross Association (USBA)
None
International Bicycle Motocross Federation (IBMXF)
None
Union Cycliste Internationale (UCI)

Pro Series Championships

Amateur
2006 NBL 30 & Over Open Wheels Grand National Champion

Notable accolades
Named one of the ten hottest and fastest rookie pros of 1992 by BMX Plus! magazine.

Significant injuries
He had an injured shoulder during the weekend of August 19, 1990 and sat out the ABA Great Northwest Nationals in Seattle, Washington.

Racing habits and traits

Miscellaneous

Post BMX career

BMX press magazine interviews and articles
"Bio: Kiyomi Waller" Go October 1990 Vol.1 Iss.12 pg.50
"Young Guns II"BMX Plus! June 1992 Vol.17 No.6 pg.27 One of ten rookie pro racers given a short listing profile article.

BMX magazine covers
Bicycle Motocross News:
None
Minicycle/BMX Action & Super BMX:
None
Bicycle Motocross Action & Go:
None
BMX Plus!:
March 1992 Vol.15 No.3
February 1997 Vol.20 No.2 (403) in bottom right insert. In middle insert Randy Stumpfhauser (200) leading race of pros including Brian Foster (3) on the inside in second; Charles Townsend (10) in fourth; unidentified (16) in third. In top right insert dirt jumper Matt Beringer. In bottom left insert various helmets.
September 1997 Vol.20 No.9 (18) in bottom insert racing Mike Hajek (25) Top image Redline racing frame. Main image: Dave Voelker
June 1998 Vol.21 No.6 (18) with Danny Nelson (6).
Total BMX:
None
Bicycles and Dirt:
None
Snap BMX Magazine & Transworld BMX:
None
NBA World & NBmxA World (The official NBA/NBmxA membership publication):

Bicycles Today & BMX Today (The official NBL membership publication through one name change):

ABA Action, American BMXer, BMXer (the official ABA publication through two name changes):
American BMXer March 1990 Vol.12 No.2 in the center panel with  Todd Corbitt ay left and Eric Abbadessa at right inseparate panels.
USBA Racer (The official USBA membership publication):

Notes

External links
 The American Bicycle Association (ABA) Website.
 The National Bicycle League (NBL) Website.

1967 births
Living people
American male cyclists
BMX riders
Sportspeople from Oceanside, California